Veronica Ewers (born September 1, 1994) is an American professional racing cyclist, who currently rides for UCI Women's World Team .

Major results
2021
 2nd Overall Joe Martin Stage Race
 3rd Road race, National Road Championships
 5th Overall Tour Cycliste Féminin International de l'Ardèche
2022
 1st Clasica Femenina Navarra
 2nd Overall Grand Prix Elsy Jacobs
1st Stage 2
 2nd Durango-Durango Emakumeen Saria
 2nd Emakumeen Nafarroako Klasikoa
 5th Overall Tour de Romandie
 5th Time trial, National Road Championships
 8th Overall The Women's Tour
 9th Overall Tour de France
 10th Overall Itzulia

References

External links
 

1994 births
Living people
American female cyclists
21st-century American women
Cyclists from Idaho